Achryson is a genus of beetles in the family Cerambycidae. 

Containing the following species:

 Achryson chacoense Di Iorio, 2003
 Achryson foersteri Bosq, 1953
 Achryson immaculipenne Gounelle, 1909
 Achryson jolyi Monne, 2006
 Achryson lineolatum Erichson, 1847
 Achryson lutarium Burmeister, 1865
 Achryson maculatum Burmeister, 1865
 Achryson maculipenne (Lacordaire, 1869)
 Achryson meridionale Martins, 1976
 Achryson peracchii Martins, 1976
 Achryson philippii Germain, 1897
 Achryson pictum Bates, 1870
 Achryson quadrimaculatum (Fabricius, 1792)
 Achryson surinamum (Linnaeus, 1767)
 Achryson undulatum Burmeister, 1865
 Achryson unicolor Bruch, 1908
 Achryson uniforme Martins & Monné, 1975

References

Achrysonini
Cerambycidae genera